The men's 110 metres hurdles event at the 1998 Commonwealth Games was held 19–20 September on National Stadium, Bukit Jalil.

Medalists

Results

Heats
Qualification: First 2 of each heat (Q) and the next 2 fastest qualified for the final.

Wind:Heat 1: -0.3 m/s, Heat 3: -0.4 m/s

Final
Wind: -0.1 m/s

References

110
1998